ABCH may refer to: 

 Address Book Clearing House, a feature of Microsoft Windows Live Messenger 8.0
 The trading symbol for BancABC, a financial services provider in Central and Southern Africa, on the Botswana Stock Exchange and Zimbabwe Stock Exchange